Spytkowice  is a village in Wadowice County, Lesser Poland Voivodeship, in southern Poland. It is the seat of the gmina (administrative district) called Gmina Spytkowice.

The village has a population of 3,700.

External links
 Jewish Community in Spytkowice on Virtual Shtetl

References

Spytkowice